John Langford may refer to:
John Langford (engineer), president of Aurora Flight Sciences
John Langford (computer scientist), at Microsoft Research
John Langford (rugby union) (born 1968), Australian rugby union player
John Alfred Langford (1823–1903), English journalist, poet and antiquary

See also
Jon Langford (born 1957), musician and artist
John Langford-Holt (1916–1993), British politician